Associació Deportiva Torreforta, also known as AD Torreforta, is an amateur Basketball team based in Tarragona, Catalonia, Spain.

Season by season

Trophies and awards

Individual awards
LEB Plata MVP
Ronald Thompson – 2010

External links
Official website

Sport in Tarragona
Catalan basketball teams
Basketball teams established in 1983
Former LEB Plata teams